Voltaire High is a French television series created by Marie Roussin and released by Amazon Prime Video on June 14, 2021. Voltaire High follows the adventures of Michelle, Annick and Simone as they join an all-boys' high school in the early 1960s, at the beginning of co-education.

Cast and characters

Main characters 

 Léonie Souchaud as Michèle Magnan
 Lula Cotton-Frapier as Annick Sabiani
 Anouk Villemin as Simone Palladino
 Nathan Parent as Henri Pichon
 Baptiste Masseline as Jean-Pierre Magnan, Michèle's big brother
 Gaspard Meier-Chaurand as Alain Laubrac
 Pierre Deladonchamps as Paul Bellanger, Voltaire's chief supervisor
 Nina Meurisse as Camille Couret, English teacher
 Maud Wyler as Jeanne Bellanger, Voltaire's nurse
 Gaspard Gevin-Hié as Daniel Applebaum

Supporting characters 

 Arthur Legrand as Jean Dupin
 François Rollin as Mr Jacquet, the headteacher
 Gérald Laroche as Louis Douillard, Latin teacher
 Anne Le Ny as Hélène Giraud, history teacher
 Vassil Schneider as Joseph Descamps
 Antoine Werner as Didier Felbec
 Dimitri Fouque as Charles Vergoux
 Enzo Monchauzou as Yves Laminiere
 Adil Mekki as Ahmed Belkacem
 Maxime d'Aboville as Emile Marcelin, French and philosophy teacher
 Martial Courcier as Raymond Meyer, chemistry teacher
 Rémi Pedevilla as Lucien Moreau, PE teacher
 Camille Charbeau as Maurice Vannel, Voltaire's supervisor
 Edouard Michelon as Leon De Goff, maths teacher
 Antoine Pelletier as Serge Casiro
 Francis Leplay as Rene Herman, biology teacher
 Margot Bancilhon as Denise, Jeanne Bellanger's girlfriend
 Emilien Vekemans as Roger Lagarrigue
 Karen Alyx as Germaine Magnan
 Christophe Kourotchkine as Gerard Magnan
 Meylie Vignaud as Martine Gomez
 Louis Ould-Yaou as Yves Blouson noir
 Amira Casar as Irène
 Anne Le Guernec as Alice (Ep 5)

Filming locations 

 Voltaire High: Abbaye royale, Saint-Jean-d'Angély, France
 Magnan Butcher: 9 rue de Verdun, Saint-Jean-d'Angély, France

Episodes

Season 1 (2021)

Awards 

Voltaire High received rave reviews in France and around the globe. It has been called "delicious", novel, cross-generational, and groundbreaking.     
After its success on Prime Video, the series went on to win the Prix du public de la série française at the Canneseries Festival, ahead of other French hits like Lupin. Executive producers Eleonore Dailly and Edouard de Lachomette, who focus on promoting outstanding female voices, championed the modern take of the series on parity and the 1960s sexual revolution: "These educated girls were the trailblazers that helped empower their peers. It shocked me when I found out that French women were forbidden to have their own bank accounts until 1965. It's crucial for us as producers to enable stories of hope and change in our rather tormented times."

References

External links
 

Amazon Prime Video original programming
2021 French television series debuts
French-language television shows